Those Who Can't is an American sitcom that premiered February 11, 2016 on truTV. On December 1, 2015, the show was renewed for a second season before the first season aired. The pre-launch renewal is a first for the cable net, which ordered 12 episodes for the second season. On January 5, 2017, truTV renewed the series for a third season of 13 episodes, which began airing on January 14, 2019. The series was canceled on April 24, 2019. On December 1, 2020, all three seasons of Those Who Can't became available for viewing on the streaming service HBO Max.

Premise
Those Who Can't is a half-hour sitcom set in Denver, Colorado. The show follows three dysfunctional teachers, played by show creators Adam Cayton-Holland, Andrew Orvedahl and Ben Roy of the Denver-based comedy trio The Grawlix. More inept than the kids they teach, they're out to beat the system as they struggle to survive each day on their own terms. Maria Thayer stars as the school librarian with a bubbling passion for life. The show is set in the fictional Smoot High School, named after the Smoot-Hawley Tariff Act.

The show was originally set up for Amazon Studios who paid $50,000 to shoot the pilot.  Amazon gave it a script order for 6 more episodes but ultimately did not order it to series.  The show was acquired by truTV as their first-ever full-length scripted comedy and was ordered with 10-episodes.  The acquisition was part of truTV's comedy-driven “Way More Fun” programming initiative. When the show was first created, Cayton-Holland stated they wrote the character of Abbey Logan (originally played by comedian Nikki Glaser), the high-school librarian, as the love interest.  Orvedahl stated that in the pilot, Abbey "just sort of lived in the library and served only to flirt with Adam’s character.” The character and role was revised for the shows run at truTV and Abbey is stated to have become "one of the gang" with all the characters now on equal footing.

The show holds a TV-MA rating due to language and sexually suggestive humor. Its title is a reference to the George Bernard Shaw idiom "those who can, do; those who can't, teach."

Cast

Main
Adam Cayton-Holland as Loren Payton. A Spanish teacher who dwells on the fact that he once spent a semester in Spain, Loren is a major hipster who would rather spend his time at brewery openings than in the classroom. Loren is a spoiled and self-absorbed narcissist who grew up with wealthy parents.    
Andrew Orvedahl as Andy Fairbell. A gym teacher/JV volleyball coach/health teacher, Fairbell has a good heart but his naïveté and lack of social skills often leaves him on the receiving end of abuse from others as a result. He has been described as a "human golden retriever."  
Ben Roy as Billy Shoemaker. Shoemaker is a former high school punk rocker with tattooed arms and massive anger management issues. Separated from his wife, with whom he shares a son, he struggles to reconcile his past as an anti-establishment troublemaker who spent several years touring with his punk band, "Capitalist Emulsification," with his adult life as a history teacher and responsible family man. 
Maria Thayer as Abbey Logan. The school librarian, who serves as the voice of reason against the other main cast and their schemes but is shown to be just as depraved as the others when pushed. 
Rory Scovel as Principal  Geoffrey Quinn.  The naive school principal, who is just as incompetent as the teaching staff.  Quinn considers "cool guy" Loren Payton to be his best friend, but it is mostly a one-sided friendship.

Recurring
Sonya Eddy as Tammy, the secretary to Principal Quinn.  She is often the only sensible person in the school, but is largely ignored and ridiculed. Tammy and Loren Payton have a strong mutual dislike.  
Kyle Kinane as Rod Knorr, an alcoholic teacher at Smoot.  He is rarely sober at school, other than a few short stints of abstinence, and often gets caught up in the schemes of the other teachers.  Billy Shoemaker dated his mother, Doris, until her death, which really bothered him. Often distills crème de menthe and is a big fan of Señor Frog's margaritas.
The Sklar Brothers as Drs. Rick and Astor Green, a pair of twins who often take turns pretending to be the same school physician.
Susie Essman as Leslie Bronn, the school's home ec teacher. She is sarcastic and abrasive and seems to have side hustles, such as making rock candy with Loren to sell when the school's vending machines were removed.
Mary Lynn Rajskub as Summer, the drama teacher who is slightly unhinged.
Peter Stormare as Superintendent Carson, the district superintendent who unsuccessfully attempts to run for mayor of Denver.
Cheri Oteri as Cattie Goodman, a "fixer" for the school district who is assigned to replace Quinn as principal after his arrest. She is a devout Christian and is constantly horrified at the gang's antics, which eventually drive her insane.
Patton Oswalt as Gil Nash, a real estate developer who is elected mayor and is revealed to be sabotaging the school so he can tear it down and build condos on the land.
Jerry Minor as Steven Sweeney, Smoot's new guidance counselor whom the gang sees as a threat to their slacker lifestyle and whom Quinn uses as a personal therapist.

Guests
Sarah Michelle Gellar as Gwen Stephanie, the president of the PTA.
T.J. Miller as Uncle Jake, owner of a local pizzeria and Loren's cousin.
Mark Hoppus as Measles, one of Shoemaker's former bandmates.
Michael Madsen as Officer Callahan, the new school police officer, who is revealed to be blind and riding out his service until retirement.
Will Sasso as Coach Irontoe, a former Denver Bronco whom Cattie appoints as new football coach, but is secretly stealing from the school.
Kurt Angle as Coach Joe Donnelly, wrestling coach for a rival school whom Abbey has a crush on.

Locations
Van Nuys High School is used as a stand-in for exterior shots of Smoot High.

Episodes

Series overview

Season 1 (2016)

Season 2 (2016)

Season 3 (2019)

Reception

Critical response
For the first season, the review aggregator Rotten Tomatoes reported a 40% approval rating with an average rating of 5.9/10, based on 10 reviews, with a mixed response from critics: Allison Shoemaker from The A.V. Club gave season 1 a rating "B+", writing: "Cayton-Holland, Orvedahl, and Roy seem to be having the time of their lives, and it's almost impossible to watch people having that much fun without getting in the spirit of things.", while Mark A. Perigard from the American daily newspaper Boston Herald rated the show a "D", reporting: "Watching Those Who Can't is like being stuck in Saturday detention. It feels like forever.". Metacritic graded the series a weighted average rating of 57 out of 100, based on 8 critics, indicating "mixed or average reviews".

References

External links
Those Who Can't official website

2016 American television series debuts
2019 American television series endings
2010s American high school television series
2010s American sitcoms
2010s American workplace comedy television series
English-language television shows
TruTV original programming
Television series about educators
Television shows set in Colorado
Television series by 3 Arts Entertainment
Amazon Prime Video original programming